Yoli Eudes Paul Bahin (born July 10, 1983) is an Ivorian professional basketball player.  He currently plays for ASFAR of the Moroccan Nationale 1 basketball league. 

He was a member of the Ivory Coast's national basketball team at the AfroBasket 2015 in Radès, Tunisia.

External links
 FIBA Afrobasket 2015 profile
 Afrobasket.com profile
 FIBA Archive profile

References

1983 births
Living people
Ivorian men's basketball players
Guards (basketball)
Ivorian expatriate sportspeople in Morocco
Expatriate basketball people in Morocco
Sportspeople from Abidjan